Huacshash or Huaqshash (possibly from local Quechua waqsa, meaning eye tooth) is a mountain in the west of the Huayhuash mountain range in the Andes of Peru, about  high. It is located in the Lima Region, Cajatambo Province, Cajatambo District. Huacshash lies on a sub-range in the west, south of the Huayllapa River, north of the Pumarinri River and southeast of the villages of Huayllapa and Auquimarca.

References

Mountains of Peru
Mountains of Lima Region